The Gobi Desert  (Chinese: 戈壁 (沙漠), Mongolian: Говь (ᠭᠣᠪᠢ))  is a large desert or brushland region in East Asia, and is the sixth largest desert in the world.

Geography
The desert is widest in the west, along the line joining the Lake Bosten and the Lop Nor (87°–89° east). In 2007, it occupied an arc of land in area.

In its broadest definition, the Gobi includes the long stretch of desert extending from the foot of the Pamirs (77° east) to the Greater Khingan Mountains, 116–118° east, on the border of Manchuria; and from the foothills of the Altay, Sayan, and Yablonoi mountain ranges on the north to the Kunlun, Altyn-Tagh, and Qilian mountain ranges, which form the northern edges of the Tibetan Plateau, on the south.

A relatively large area on the east side of the Greater Khingan range, between the upper waters of the Songhua (Sungari) and the upper waters of the Liao-ho, is reckoned to belong to the Gobi by conventional usage. Some geographers and ecologists prefer to regard the western area of the Gobi region (as defined above): the basin of the Tarim in Xinjiang and the desert basin of Lop Nor and Hami (Kumul), as forming a separate and independent desert, called the Taklamakan Desert.

Much of the Gobi is not sandy, instead resembling exposed bare rock.

Climate

The Gobi is overall a cold desert, with frost and occasionally snow occurring on its dunes. Additional moisture reaches parts of the Gobi in winter as snow is blown by the wind from the Siberian Steppes.

Average winter minimums are a frigid , while summertime maximums are a warm . Most of the precipitation falls during the summer.

Although the southeast monsoons reach the southeast parts of the Gobi, the area throughout this region is generally characterized by extreme dryness, especially during the winter, when the Siberian anticyclone is at its strongest. The southern and central parts of the Gobi Desert have variable plant growth due to this monsoon activity. The more northern areas of the Gobi are very cold and dry, making it unable to support much plant growth; this cold and dry weather is attributed to Siberian-Mongolian high pressure cells. Hence, the icy dust and snowstorms of spring and early summer plus early January (winter).

Conservation, ecology, and economy
The Gobi Desert is the source of many important fossils finds, including the first dinosaur eggs, twenty-six of which, averaging  in length, were uncovered in 1923.

Archeologists and paleontologists have done excavations in the Nemegt Basin in the northwestern part of the Gobi Desert (in Mongolia), which is noted for its fossil treasures, including early mammals, dinosaur eggs, and prehistoric stone implements, some 100,000 years old.

Despite the harsh conditions, these deserts and the surrounding regions sustain many animals species, some are even unique, including black-tailed gazelles, marbled polecats, wild Bactrian camels, Mongolian wild ass and sandplovers. They are occasionally visited by snow leopards, Gobi bears, and wolves. Lizards are especially well-adapted to the climate of the Gobi Desert, with approximately 30 species distributed across its southern Mongolian border. The most common vegetation in the Gobi desert are shrubs adapted to drought. These shrubs included gray sparrow's saltwort (Salsola passerina), gray sagebrush, and low grasses such as needle grass and bridlegrass. Due to livestock grazing, the amount of shrubs in the desert has decreased. Several large nature reserves have been established in the Gobi, including Gobi Gurvansaikhan National Park, Great Gobi A and Great Gobi B Strictly Protected Area.

The area is vulnerable to trampling by livestock and off-road vehicles (effects from human intervention are greater in the eastern Gobi Desert, where rainfall is heavier and may sustain livestock). In Mongolia, grasslands have been degraded by goats, which are raised by nomadic herders as source of cashmere wool.

Large copper deposits are being mined by Rio Tinto Group. The mine was and remains controversial. There was significant opposition in Mongolia's parliament to the terms under which the mine will proceed, and some are calling for the terms to be renegotiated. Specifically, the contention revolves primarily around the question of whether negotiations were fair (Rio Tinto is far better resourced) and whether Rio Tinto will pay adequate taxes on the revenues it derives from the mine (an agreement was reached whereby the operation will be exempt from windfall tax).

Desertification
The Gobi Desert is expanding through desertification, most rapidly on the southern edge into China, which is seeing  of grassland overtaken every year. Dust storms increased in frequency between 1996 and 2016, causing further damage to China's agriculture economy. However, in some areas desertification has been slowed or reversed.

The northern and eastern boundaries between desert and grassland are constantly changing. This is mostly due to the climate conditions before the growing season, which influence the rate of evapotranspiration and subsequent plant growth.

The expansion of the Gobi is attributed mostly to human activities, locally driven by deforestation, overgrazing, and depletion of water resources, as well as to climate change. 

China has tried various plans to slow the expansion of the desert, which have met with some success. The Three-North Shelter Forest Program (or "Green Great Wall") was a Chinese government tree-planting project begun in 1978 and set to continue through 2050. The goal of the program is to reverse desertification by planting aspen and other fast-growing trees on some 36.5 million hectares across some 551 counties in 12 provinces of northern China.

Ecoregions
The Gobi, broadly defined, can be divided into five distinct dry ecoregions, based on variations in climate and topography:

It extends from the Inner Mongolian Plateau in China northward into Mongolia. It includes the Yin Mountains and many low-lying areas with salt pans and small ponds. It is bounded by the Mongolian-Manchurian grassland to the north, the Yellow River Plain to the southeast, and the Alashan Plateau semi-desert to the southeast and east.
 Alashan Plateau semi-desert, lies west and southwest of the Eastern Gobi desert steppe. It consists of the desert basins and low mountains lying between the Gobi Altai range on the north, the Helan Mountains to the southeast, and the Qilian Mountains and northeastern portion of the Tibetan Plateau on the southwest.
 Gobi Lakes Valley desert steppe, ecoregion lies north of Alashan Plateau semi-desert, between the Gobi Altai range to the south and the Khangai Mountains to the north.
 Dzungarian Basin semi-desert, includes the desert basin lying between the Altai mountains on the north and the Tian Shan range on the south. It includes the northern portion of China's Xinjiang province and extends into the southeastern corner of Mongolia. The Alashan Plateau semi-desert lies to the east, and the Emin Valley steppe to the west, on the China-Kazakhstan border.
 Tian Shan range, separates the Dzungarian Basin semi-desert from the Taklamakan Desert, which is a low, sandy desert basin surrounded by the high mountain ranges of the Tibetan Plateau to the south and the Pamirs to the west. The Taklamakan Desert ecoregion includes the Desert of Lop.

Eastern Gobi desert steppe

The surface is extremely diversified, although there are no great differences in vertical elevation. Between Ulaanbaatar and the small lake of Iren-dubasu-nor, the surface is greatly eroded. Broad flat depressions and basins are separated by groups of flat-topped mountains of relatively low elevation ), through which archaic rocks crop out as crags and isolated rugged masses. The slopes of the plateaus are more or less steep and are sometimes penetrated by "bays" of the lowlands.

Here small lakes frequently fill the depressions, though the water in them is generally salty or brackish. Through all the central parts, until the bordering mountains are reached, trees and shrubs are utterly absent. West of the route from Ulaanbaatar to Kalgan, the country presents approximately the same general features, except that the mountains are not so irregularly scattered in groups but have more strongly defined strikes, mostly east to west, west-north-west to east-south-east, and west-south-west to east-north-east.

The elevations do not form continuous chains, but make up a congeries of short ridges and groups rising from a common base and intersected by a labyrinth of ravines, gullies, glens, and basins. But the tablelands, built up of the horizontal red deposits of the Han-gai (Obruchev's Gobi formation) which are characteristic of the southern parts of eastern Mongolia, are absent here or occur only in one locality, near the Shara-muren river. They are greatly intersected by gullies or dry watercourses. Water is scarce, with no streams, no lakes, no wells, and precipitation falls seldom. The prevailing winds blow from the west and northwest, and the pall of dust overhangs the country as in the Taklamakan and the desert of Lop. Characteristic of the flora are wild garlic, Kalidium gracile, wormwood, saxaul, Nitraria schoberi, Caragana, Ephedra, saltwort and the grass Lasiagrostis splendens. The taana wild onion Allium polyrrhizum is the main browse eaten by many herd animals, and Mongolians claim that this is essential in producing the proper, hazelnut-like notes of camel airag (fermented milk).

The vast desert is crisscrossed by several trade routes, some of which have been in use for thousands of years. Among the most important are those from Kalgan (at the Great Wall) to Ulaanbaatar; from Jiuquan (in Gansu) to Hami ; from Hami to Beijing; from Hohhot to Hami and Barkul; and from Lanzhou (in Gansu) to Hami.

Alashan Plateau semi-desert

The southwestern portion of the Gobi, known also as the Xitao and the Little Gobi, fills the space between the great north loop of the Yellow River on the east, the Ejin River on the west, and the Qilian Mountains and narrow rocky chain of Longshou,  in altitude, on the southwest. The Ordos Desert, which covers the northeastern portion of the Ordos Plateau, in the great north loop of the Yellow River, is part of this ecoregion. It belongs to the middle basin of the three great depressions into which Potanin divides the Gobi as a whole.

"Topographically," says Nikolai Przhevalsky, "it is a perfectly level plain, which in all probability once formed the bed of a huge lake or inland sea." He concludes this based on the level area of the region as a whole, the hard saline clay and the sand-strewn surface and, lastly, the salt lakes which occupy its lowest parts. For hundreds of kilometers, nothing can be seen but bare sands; in some places, they continue so far without a break that the Mongols call them Tengger (i.e. sky). These vast expanses are absolutely waterless, nor do any oases relieve the unbroken stretches of yellow sand, which alternate with equally vast areas of saline clay or, nearer the foot of the mountains, with barren shingle. The vegetation is confined to a few varieties of bushes and a dozen kinds of grasses and herbs, the most conspicuous being saxaul (Haloxylon ammondendron) and Agriophyllum gobicum. The others include prickly convolvulus, field wormwood (Artemisia campestris), acacia, Inula ammophila, Sophora flavescens, Convolvulus ammanii, Peganum and Astragalus species, but all dwarfed, deformed and starved. The fauna consists of little but antelope, wolf, fox, hare, hedgehog, marten, numerous lizards and a few birds, e.g. the sandgrouse, lark, stonechat, sparrow, crane, Mongolian ground jay (Podoces hendersoni), horned lark (Eremophila alpestris), and crested lark (Galerida cristata).

Dzungarian Basin semi-desert

The Yulduz valley or valley of the Haidag-gol (–) is a mini desert enclosed by two prominent members of the Shanashen Trahen Osh mountain range, namely the chucis and the kracenard pine rallies, running perpendicular and far from one another. As they proceed south, they transcend and transpose, sweeping back on east and west respectively, with Lake Bosten in between. These two ranges mark the northern and the southern edges respectively of a great swelling, which extends eastward for nearly twenty degrees of longitude. On its northern side, the Chol-tagh descends steeply, and its foot is fringed by a string of deep depressions, ranging from Lukchun ( below sea level) to Hami ( above sea-level). To the south of the Kuruk-tagh lie the desert of Lop Nur, the Kum-tagh desert, and the valley of the Bulunzir-gol. To this great swelling, which arches up between the two border-ranges of the Chol-tagh and Kuruk-tagh, the Mongols give the name of Ghashuun-Gobi or "Salt Desert".

The Kuruk-tagh is the greatly disintegrated, denuded and wasted relic of a mountain range which used to be of incomparably greater magnitude. In the west, between Lake Bosten and the Tarim, it consists of two, possibly of three, principal ranges, which, although broken in continuity, run generally parallel to one another, and embrace between them numerous minor chains of heights. These minor ranges, together with the principal ranges, divide the region into a series of long; narrow valleys, mostly parallel to one another and to the enclosing mountain chains, which descend like terraced steps, on the one side towards the depression of Lukchun and on the other towards the desert of Lop.

In many cases these latitudinal valleys are barred transversely by ridges or spurs, generally elevations en masse of the bottom of the valley. Where such elevations exist, there is generally found, on the east side of the transverse ridge, a cauldron-shaped depression, which some time or other has been the bottom of a former lake, but is now nearly a dry salt-basin. The surface configuration is in fact markedly similar to that which occurs in the inter-mount latitudinal valleys of the Kunlun Mountains. The hydrography of the Ghashiun-Gobi and the Kuruk-tagh is determined by the aforementioned arrangements of the latitudinal valleys. Most of the principal streams, instead of flowing straight down these valleys, cross them diagonally and only turn west after they have cut their way through one or more of the transverse barrier ranges.

This range he considers to belong to the Choltagh system, whereas Sven Hedin would assign it to the Kuruk-tagh. This last, which is pretty certainly identical with the range of Kharateken-ula (also known as the Kyzyl-sanghir, Sinir, and Singher Mountains), that overlooks the southern shore of the Lake Bosten, though parted from it by the drift-sand desert of Ak-bel-kum (White Pass Sands), has at first a west-northwest to east-southeast strike, but it gradually curves round like a scimitar towards the east-northeast and at the same time gradually decreases in elevation.

At 91° east, where the principal range of the Kuruk-tagh system wheels to the east-northeast, four of its subsidiary ranges terminate, or rather die away somewhat suddenly, on the brink of a long narrow depression (in which Sven Hedin sees a northeast bay of the former great Central Asian lake of Lop-nor), having over against them the écheloned terminals of similar subordinate ranges of the Pe-shan (Boy-san) system (see below). The Kuruk-tagh is throughout a relatively low, but almost completely barren range, being entirely destitute of animal life, save for hares, antelopes and wild camels, which frequent its few small, widely scattered oases. The vegetation, which is confined to these same areas, is of the scantiest and is mainly confined to bushes of saxaul (Haloxylon), anabasis, reeds (kamish), tamarisks, poplars, and Ephedra.

History

European exploration

The Gobi had a long history of human habitation, mostly by nomadic peoples. The name of Gobi means desert in Mongolian. The region was inhabited mostly by Mongols, Uyghurs, and Kazakhs. 

The Gobi Desert as a whole was known only very imperfectly to outsiders, as information was confined to observations by individual travelers engaging in their respective itineraries across the desert. Among the European explorers who contributed to the understanding of the Gobi, the most important were the following:

 Jean-François Gerbillon (1688–1698)
 Eberhard Isbrand Ides (1692–1694)
 Lorenz Lange (1727–1728 and 1736)
 Fuss and Alexander G. von Bunge (1830–1831)
 Hermann Fritsche (1868–1873)
 Pavlinov and Z.L. Matusovski (1870)
 Ney Elias (1872–1873)
 Nikolai Przhevalsky (1870–1872 and 1876–1877)
 Zosnovsky (1875)
 Mikhail V. Pevtsov (1878)
 Grigory Potanin (1877 and 1884–1886)
 Béla Széchenyi and Lajos Lóczy (1879–1880)
 The brothers Grigory Grum-Grshimailo (1889–1890) and M. Y. Grigory Grum-Grshimailo
 Pyotr Kuzmich Kozlov (1893–1894 and 1899–1900)
 Vsevolod I. Roborovsky (1894)
 Vladimir Obruchev (1894–1896)
 Karl Josef Futterer and Dr. Holderer (1896)
 Charles-Etienne Bonin (1896 and 1899)
 Sven Hedin (1897 and 1900–1901)
 K. Bogdanovich (1898)
 Ladyghin (1899–1900) and Katsnakov (1899–1900)
 Jacques Bouly de Lesdain and Martha Mailey, 1902.

See also
 Asian Dust
 Geography of Mongolia
 Geography of China
 Green Wall of China
 List of deserts by area
 Mongolian death worm (olgoi khorkhoi), said to inhabit the Gobi in Mongolia

Citations

General references 

 Owen Lattimore. (1973) "Return to China's Northern Frontier". The Geographical Journal, Vol. 139, No. 2 (June 1973), pp. 233–242.

Further reading

 
 Cable, Mildred and French, Francesca (1943). The Gobi Desert. Landsborough Publications, London, OCLC 411792.
 Man, John (1997). Gobi: Tracking the Desert. Yale University Press, New Haven, .
 Stewart, Stanley (2001). In the Empire of Genghis Khan: A Journey Among Nomads. HarperCollins Publishers, London, .
 Thayer, Helen (2007). Walking the Gobi: 1,600 Mile-trek Across a Desert of Hope and Despair. Mountaineer Books, Seattle, WA, .
 Younghusband, Francis (1904). The Heart of a Continent. John Murray.

External links

 Map, from "China the Beautiful" (archived 13 May 2008)
 Photos tagged with gobi at Flickr

 
Biota of China
Biota of Mongolia
Deserts and xeric shrublands
Deserts of China
Deserts of Mongolia
Geography of Inner Mongolia
Physiographic provinces
Sites along the Silk Road